Whan or WHAN may refer to:

 Bob Whan (born 1933), Australian politician
 Steve Whan (born 1964), Australian politician
 William Taylor Whan (1829-1901), Irish botanist

Radio and television
 WHAN (AM), a radio station (1430 AM) licensed to Ashland, Virginia, United States
 WRLW-CD, a low-power television station (channel 21, virtual channel 17) licensed to serve Salem, Indiana, United States, which held the call sign WHAN-LP from 1996 to 2015
 Former callsign of WLVF-FM in Haines City, Florida, United States

See also
 Wan (disambiguation)
 What (disambiguation)
 When (disambiguation)
 Hwan (disambiguation)